Tapu is a locality on the western side of the Coromandel Peninsula of New Zealand. State Highway 25 runs through it. Coromandel is 35 km to the north, and Thames is 19 km to the south. The Tapu River flows from the Coromandel Range past the settlement and into the Firth of Thames to the west.

The "Tapu-Coroglen Road", a windy gravel road, connects it across the Coromandel Range with Coroglen in the east. The Square Kauri is on this road.

Demographics
Tapu is described by Statistics New Zealand as a rural settlement. Tapu is part of the larger Thames Coast statistical area.

Tapu had a population of 249 at the 2018 New Zealand census, an increase of 42 people (20.3%) since the 2013 census, and a decrease of 18 people (−6.7%) since the 2006 census. There were 114 households, comprising 120 males and 132 females, giving a sex ratio of 0.91 males per female, with 21 people (8.4%) aged under 15 years, 18 (7.2%) aged 15 to 29, 99 (39.8%) aged 30 to 64, and 105 (42.2%) aged 65 or older.

Ethnicities were 90.4% European/Pākehā, 14.5% Māori, 1.2% Pacific peoples, 0.0% Asian, and 2.4% other ethnicities. People may identify with more than one ethnicity.

Although some people chose not to answer the census's question about religious affiliation, 47.0% had no religion, 41.0% were Christian, 1.2% were Muslim and 1.2% had other religions.

Of those at least 15 years old, 30 (13.2%) people had a bachelor's or higher degree, and 69 (30.3%) people had no formal qualifications. 15 people (6.6%) earned over $70,000 compared to 17.2% nationally. The employment status of those at least 15 was that 66 (28.9%) people were employed full-time, 30 (13.2%) were part-time, and 6 (2.6%) were unemployed.

Education
Tapu School is a coeducational full primary (years 1–8) school with a decile rating of 4 and a roll of 28.

References

External links
 Tapu School website

Thames-Coromandel District
Populated places in Waikato
Populated places around the Firth of Thames